"Forever" is the second single from Californian rock band Papa Roach's fifth album, The Paramour Sessions, and ninth released single in total. "Forever" peaked at number two on the Modern Rock Tracks chart (for nine weeks) and number two on the Mainstream Rock chart (for six weeks). It also peaked at number 55 on the Billboard Hot 100, making it their second-highest charting single there.

Music video

There was a contest on YouTube in which fans created their own videos for the song, with the official video, directed by Meiert Avis, shot on May 23, 2007 in the Los Angeles area. On June 15, 2007, the video made its official debut on AOL.

Track listing

Chart performance

References

2006 singles
Papa Roach songs
Music videos directed by Meiert Avis
Song recordings produced by Howard Benson
2006 songs
Geffen Records singles
Songs written by Tobin Esperance
Songs written by Jacoby Shaddix
Songs written by Jerry Horton